Peter Williams Gautier (born September 25, 1965) is a United States Coast Guard vice admiral who serves as the deputy commandant for operations. He previously served as the deputy commander of the Coast Guard Pacific Area.

In April 2022, he was nominated for promotion to vice admiral and appointment as deputy commandant for operations.

References

External links 

Living people
United States Coast Guard admirals
1965 births